The following people have served as presidents of the Church College of Hawaii (1955–74) and Brigham Young University–Hawaii (after 1974). This list does not include presidents of Brigham Young University (Provo, Utah) or Brigham Young University–Idaho.

References

External links
List of BYUH presidents on the school's website

 
Brigham Young-Hawaii
Brigham Young University–Hawaii